Statistics of Danish National Football Tournament in the 1919/1920 season.

Province tournament

First round
Boldklubben 1901 2-1 Boldklubben Søstjernen
Boldklubben 1909 1-4 Ringkøbing IF

Second round
Boldklubben 1901 2-1 Ringkøbing IF

Copenhagen Championship

Final
Boldklubben 1903 2-0 Boldklubben 1901

References
Denmark - List of final tables (RSSSF)

Top level Danish football league seasons
1919–20 in Danish football
Denmark